Magic Goes Wrong is a comedy play by Henry Lewis, Jonathan Sayer, Henry Shields (of Mischief Theatre Company) and Penn & Teller. It follows the series of Mischief's Goes Wrong series of plays following The Play That Goes Wrong and Peter Pan Goes Wrong.

Production history 
The play opened in the Quays Theatre at The Lowry, Salford from 6 to 11 August 2019, prior to its opening in London's West End at the Vaudeville Theatre from 14 December 2019. It is notable for employing a far greater level of black comedy than previous instalments in the Goes Wrong series, including many on-stage gory demises for the guest characters. Although, slightly paradoxically, the ending is considerably more upbeat and sentimental than the group's other productions.

The play was the third Mischief production running simultaneously in the West End alongside the long-running productions of The Play That Goes Wrong and The Comedy About a Bank Robbery (until its closure in March 2020), and the fourth in London while Peter Pan Goes Wrong played the Christmas 2019 season at the Alexandra Palace.

In March 2020, the play stopped performances due to the COVID-19 pandemic. The play resumed its London run on 21 October 2021 at a new venue, the Apollo Theatre. A UK tour commenced at the Curve, Leicester from 20 July 2021.

Cast and characters

Awards and nominations

References 

2019 plays
Mischief Theatre
West End plays
British plays